Hugo Schnekloth (April 24, 1923 – June 21, 1996) was an American politician who served in the Iowa House of Representatives from 1977 to 1991.

References

1923 births
1996 deaths
Republican Party members of the Iowa House of Representatives
20th-century American politicians